Justine Lucas (born 3 May 1990) is an English rugby union player. She represents England and made her debut in 2013. She was named in the 2017 Women's Rugby World Cup squad for England.

Lucas began her rugby career at the age of 20 in her final year at Loughborough University where she attained a degree in Sports Science and Maths. She signed with Wasps Ladies for the Premier 15s in 2017.

References

External links 
 RFU Player Profile

1990 births
Living people
England women's international rugby union players
English female rugby union players